In stochastic calculus, the Boué–Dupuis formula is variational representation for Wiener functionals. The representation has application in finding large deviation asymptotics.

The theorem was proven in 1998 by Michelle Boué and Paul Dupuis. In 2000 the result was generalized to infinite-dimensional Brownian motions and in 2009 extended to abstract Wiener spaces.

Boué–Dupuis formula
Let  be the classical Wiener space and  be a -dimensional standard Brownian motion. Then for all bounded and measurable functions
 we have the following variational representation

where:
The infimum runs over all processes which are progressively measurable with respect to the augmented filtration  generated by 
 denotes the -dimensional Euclidean norm.

References

Stochastic calculus
Wiener process
Probability theorems
Calculus of variations